The Business Innovation Center of Croatia or BICRO is an agency of the Croatian government formed in 1998 and responsible for allocating state funding for research and development projects.

The agency's main goal is providing successful and efficient support to technological development and commercial use of research outputs by creating financial and material conditions for companies who wish to increase their competitiveness or facilitate introduction of new products or services to the market. The agency mainly does this by approving financial aid and incentives to small- and medium-sized companies for research and development.

In 2014, the merger of the BICRO woth the Croatian Agency for Small Businesses and Investments (HAMAG INVEST) was carried out, with the purpose to create a unique system that will provide support to entrepreneurs through all development stages, and the Croatian Agency for Small Businesses and Investments changed its name to the Croatian Agency for Small Businesses, Innovations and Investments (HAMAG BICRO).

References

External links
Official website

Organizations established in 1998
Government agencies of Croatia
Economy of Croatia
1998 establishments in Croatia